Mingjiao Temple is a Buddhist temple located in Mingjiao Village of Zhuji, Zhejiang, China.

History
According to Zhuji County Annuals, the temple traces was first built in 942, in the 7th year of Tianfu period (936–941) in the Later Jin (Five Dynasties) (936–947), and would later become the "Tongjiao Temple" in the reign of Emperor Zhenzong (998–1022) in the Northern Song dynasty (960–1279). After Emperor Renzong's (1023–1063) accession to the throne, the name was changed into "Mingjiao Temple" to name after a famous Chan Master Mingjiao. The temple underwent two major renovations in the Qing dynasty (1644–1911), respectively in the ruling of Jiaqing Emperor (1818) and in the reign of Tongzhi Emperor (1866). In the 1980s, Shou Huating and other Buddhist believers donated property to establish the Hall of Four Heavenly Kings and wing rooms. The temple was finally allowed to revive its religious activities in 1995.

References

Buddhist temples in Zhejiang
Buildings and structures in Shaoxing
Tourist attractions in Shaoxing
19th-century establishments in China
19th-century Buddhist temples
Religious buildings and structures completed in 1866